Tetheopsis is an extinct genus of Uintatheriidae.

References

Taxa named by Edward Drinker Cope
Dinoceratans
Fossil taxa described in 1885
Prehistoric placental genera